No Cure for Cancer is one of Denis Leary's standup routines from the early 1990s.  It was made into a television special, a book, and a compact disc, all with the same title. Leary's routine focuses on vegetarians, cigarette smoking, drug use, and political correctness.

Compact disc 
The album was recorded live at Irving Plaza, New York City on October 10, 1992, and at Sorcerer Studios, New York City.

Track listing 
 "Asshole" – 4:26
 "Drugs" – 8:24
 "Rehab" – 4:03
 "More Drugs" – 7:06
 "Smoke" – 5:28
 "Meat" – 4:01
 "Death" – 5:01
 "The Downtrodden Song" – 1:22
 "Traditional Irish Folk Song" – 2:00
 "Voices in My Head" – 3:37

Personnel 
 Denis Leary – vocals
 Adam Roth – guitar, mandolin, bass, vocals
 Chris Phillips – vocals, bass, acoustic and 12-string guitar
 Breda Mayock – violin
 Ger Mayock – pennywhistle
 C.P. Roth – keyboards
 Don Castagno – drums, percussion
 Pete Mark – congas
 Steve Remote – chief engineer
 Ted Jensen – mastering engineer

Television special 
The television version of No Cure for Cancer was first broadcast by Channel 4 in the United Kingdom on February 3, 1993, followed by Showtime in the United States on February 20, then in Australia on the Nine Network on April 6, 1994.

DVD 
In 2005, the DVD Complete Denis Leary was released. A collection of his most famous stand-up performances including: No Cure for Cancer and Lock 'n Load. Special features include: the music videos for "Asshole" and "Love Barge", and the Making of No Cure for Cancer, a documentary with Leary and others.

Accusations of plagiarism of Bill Hicks 
Although Leary had been friends with fellow comedian Bill Hicks for many years, when Hicks heard No Cure For Cancer, he felt that Leary had stolen his act. The friendship ended abruptly as a result, and was still unsettled when Hicks died of pancreatic cancer 13 months later, at the age of 32. Over the years, several comedians have publicly stated they believe Leary stole Hicks' persona and attitude, in addition to his material. Jokes on the album about Keith Richards, Judas Priest, smoking and "good men dying young" are frequently cited as bearing similarities to Hicks' routines.

According to Cynthia True's biography American Scream: The Bill Hicks Story, after listening to No Cure For Cancer, Hicks was furious. "All these years, aside from the occasional jibe, he had pretty much shrugged off Leary's lifting. Comedians borrowed, stole stuff and even bought bits from one another. Milton Berle and Robin Williams were famous for it. This was different. Leary had, practically line for line, taken huge chunks of Bill's act and recorded it."

In the August 2006 Playboy, an interviewer told Leary, "Much has been written about you and comedian Bill Hicks...People have accused you of appropriating his persona and material." Leary replied:

Charts

References

External links 

Denis Leary albums
Works involved in plagiarism controversies
1993 live albums
1993 debut albums
A&M Records live albums
Live comedy albums
Spoken word albums by American artists
1990s comedy albums
Stand-up comedy albums